Joseph Natus (March 1, 1860 – April 21, 1917) was an American minstrel performer and recording artist who was prominent during the early 20th century. He was a tenor.

He was born in Detroit, Michigan.

He partnered with Arthur Collins in 1901 and they made 19 Edison cylinder recording and several Victor recording through 1902. They also recorded as part of a quartet, including a performance of the song Goodbye, Dolly Gray that was popular.

Natus also recorded a version of the song Coon, Coon, Coon.

He died April 21, 1917, in Rome, New York.

Discography
I'm longing in my heart for you Louise
Home sweet home
The girl you dream about
"I'll be with you when the roses bloom again"
"All for a man whose god was gold"
"My lonesome little Louisiana lady"

References

External links
Findagrave entry

1917 deaths
1860 births